Greatest Hits is the first sompilation album by American country music duo The Bellamy Brothers. It was released in 1982 via Warner Bros. and Curb Records.

Track listing

Chart performance

References

1982 compilation albums
The Bellamy Brothers albums
Albums produced by Jimmy Bowen
Warner Records compilation albums
Curb Records compilation albums